The Houtong Cat Village or Houdong Cat Village is a village in Ruifang District, New Taipei, Taiwan known for its cat population.

Name
Houtong was originally called Kau-tong due to the existence of a cave inhabited by monkeys in the early days.

History
Houtong was once a rich small mining town in Ruifang, renowned for a well-preserved culture surrounding its railway, which was built during the Japanese rule of Taiwan. During its prosperous years, the area produced around 220,000 tons of coal per year, the largest coal output of a single area in Taiwan. This attracted many immigrants to the area, which further spurred the town's growth to as many as 900 households with a population of more than 6,000 people. The last facility built in the area was a coal purification factory, built in 1920.

As the coal mining industry began to decline in the 1990s, the area also declined. Young residents started to emigrate to look for other opportunities, and eventually only a few hundred residents remained once the mining industry had died out.

However, in 2008 a local cat lover organized volunteers to start offering abandoned cats a better life. They posted the cats' pictures online, resulting in an overwhelming response from other cat lovers around the nation. Soon, Houtong became a center for cat lovers as word spread, and the number of cats living there increased – thus reviving a declining village, and transforming it into a tourist destination. Some cats are sterilized, and will have one of their ears trimmed as confirmation – this helps to keep check on the local population of cats, and also helps identify new cats which enter into the village.

Features
The village features shops, cafes and relaxing places for tourists. It is also located near the origin of the Keelung River. The pristine, green waters of the river are accessible via steps. Drivers entering the town are greeted with a sign that reads "A lot of stray cats here. Drive slowly." A special bridge has been constructed above the busy railway, to allow safe passage for the cats.

Transportation
The village is accessible from Houtong Station of Taiwan Railways. From Jiufen, it is approximately 10 minutes and NT 350 by taxi, which makes it a good secondary destination after Jiufen if planning a day trip. Houtong is also the origin of two trails which can be hiked to reach Jiufen.

See also
 Mining in Taiwan
 List of endemic species of Taiwan

References

Cats
Geography of New Taipei
Tourist attractions in New Taipei
Villages in Taiwan